Bukatsite  is a village in the municipality of Smolyan, located in the Smolyan Province of southern Bulgaria. The village covers an area of 10.048 km2 and is located 171.46 km from Sofia. As of 2007, the village had a population of 44 people.

References

Villages in Smolyan Province